Balkars ( or Таулула,  'Mountaineers') are a Turkic people of the Caucasus region, one of the titular populations of Kabardino-Balkaria. Their Karachay-Balkar language is of the Ponto-Caspian subgroup of the Northwestern (Kipchak) group of Turkic languages.

Identity 
The modern Balkars identify as a Turkic people, who share their language with the Karachays from Karachay-Cherkessia and have strong lingual similarities with Kumyks from Dagestan.

Sometimes Balkars and Karachays are referred to as to a single ethnicity.

History
The ethnogenesis of the Balkars resulted, in part, from an invasion of Alania during the 11th century, by Kipchak Turks and their Cuman allies. Alania had its capital in Maghas, which some authors locate at Arkhyz, in the mountains currently inhabited by the Karachay-Balkar, while others place it in either what is now modern Ingushetia or North Ossetia.

During the 14th century, Alania was destroyed by Timur. Many of the Alans, Cumans, and Kipchaks migrated westward into Europe. Timur's incursion into the North Caucasus introduced the remainder to Islam.

Most Balkars adopted Islam in the eighteenth century due to contact with the Kumyks, Circassians, Nogais, and Crimean Tatars. The Balkars are considered deeply religious. The Sufi Qadiriya order has a strong presence in the region.

In the 19th century, Russia annexed the area during the Russian conquest of the Caucasus. On October 20, 1828 the  took place, in which the Russian troops were under the command of General Georgi Emmanuel.

Deportation

In 1944, the Soviet government forcibly deported almost the entire Balkar population to Kazakhstan, Kyrgyzstan and Omsk Oblast in Siberia. Starting on 8 March 1944 and finishing the following day, the NKVD loaded 37,713 Balkars onto 14 train echelons bound for Central Asia and Siberia. The Stalin regime placed the exiled Balkars under special settlement restrictions identical to those that it had imposed upon the deported Russian-Germans, Kalmyks, Karachais, Chechens and Ingush. By October 1946 the Balkar population had been reduced to 32,817 due to deaths from malnutrition and disease. The Balkars remained confined by the special settlement restrictions until 28 April 1956. Only in 1957, however, could they return to their mountainous homeland in the Caucasus. During 1957 and 1958, 34,749 Balkars returned home.

Language and literacy

In the Cyrillic alphabet as used by the Balkars there are eight vowels and twenty-seven consonants. In the past the official written languages were Arabic for religious services and Turkish for business matters. From 1920 on Balkar has been the language of instruction in primary schools; subsequent instruction is carried out in Russian. Until 1928 Arabic letters were used to write the Balkar language; after 1937  Cyrillic was used. Ninety-six percent of the population is bilingual in Balkar and Russian. Organs of mass culture, secondary school texts, newspapers, and magazines in both Balkar and Russian continue to increase in number. In the 2015 number of bilingual population had increased by 1,3 percent so 97,3 are now speaking both Balkar and Russian which is due to the globalisation of urban areas and the impact of the Russian education. Children are more likely to be taught in Russian.

An example of a Balkar author is Kaisyn Kuliev  who is emphasising the love towards the Balkarya land and Balkar traditions.

Notable Balkars
Khadzhimurat Akkaev, weightlifter
Asker Dzhappuyev, jihadist leader
Dzhambulat Khatokhov, world's heaviest child from 2003
Alim Kouliev, actor, theatre director 
Azamat Kuliev, artist
Kaisyn Kuliev, poet
Alikhan Shavayev, football player 
Albert Tumenov, professional mixed martial artist
Scarlett la Queen, Russian-American singer and actress

See also
Balkar and Karachay nationalism
Karachays
Bulgars
Urusbiy

Notes

References
 
 Robert Conquest, The Nation Killers: The Soviet Deportation of Nationalities (London: MacMillan, 1970)
 Alexander Nekrich, The Punished Peoples: The Deportation and Fate of Soviet Minorities at the End of the Second World War (New York: W. W. Norton, 1978)

Ethnic groups in Dagestan
Ethnic groups in Russia
Muslim communities of Russia
Kabardino-Balkaria
Peoples of the Caucasus
Turkic peoples of Europe
Muslim communities of the Caucasus